Harry F. Noller (born June 10, 1939) is an American biochemist, and since 1992 the director of the  University of California, Santa Cruz's Center for the Molecular Biology of RNA. He has made significant contributions to our understanding of the ribosome and is a member of the National Academy of Sciences.

Early life and education
Noller is a native of Oakland, California. He earned his B.S. degree in biochemistry at the University of California, Berkeley in 1960  and his Ph.D. in chemistry from the University of Oregon in 1965 He carried out post-doctoral work at the Medical Research Council Laboratory of Molecular Biology in Cambridge and the Institute of Molecular Biology at the University of Geneva.

Scientific contributions and honors
Noller joined the faculty at University of California, Santa Cruz in 1968. In his decades-long study of the molecular translational machinery of the cell, he has made fundamental contributions in understanding the structure and function of the cell's protein-synthesis factory, the ribosome.  Notable amongst these contributions are having demonstrated that the ribosome is a ribozyme and leading the solution of the first crystal structures at molecular resolution for complete ribosomes.

Noller was elected to the National Academy of Sciences in 1992. He has been recognized with prizes from the Paul Ehrlich Foundation in 2006 and the Gairdner Foundation in 2007, each of which was shared with eventual winners of the Nobel Prize in Chemistry for 2009. He won a Breakthrough Prize in 2016.

References

External links 
 Harry Noller faculty description page from UCSC MCDB Department 

1939 births
American biochemists
American biophysicists
Living people
Members of the United States National Academy of Sciences
Foreign Members of the Russian Academy of Sciences
University of California, Berkeley alumni
University of California, Santa Cruz faculty
University of Oregon alumni